Cambridge City Hockey Club is a field hockey club based at Wilberforce Road in Cambridge, England. Facilities at the Wilberforce Road Sports Ground were expanded to include three artificial pitches in October 2018.

Founded in 1906 the club now runs seven men's teams, five women's teams and a junior section. The men's first team play in the  Men's England Hockey League Division 1 North (the highest league structure in England) and the women's first team play in the Investec Women's England Hockey League Division 1 South (the highest league structure in England). The Junior Academy is run by former Olympian Nick Thompson.

Major national honours
 1981–82 Men's League Runner Up

Notable players

Men's internationals

Women's internationals

Other honours
CCHC 3rd XI - shortlisted for England Hockey Team of the Year 2018 
Living Sport Club of the Year 2014/15 
Shortlisted for England Hockey Club of the Year 2014/15

References

English field hockey clubs